Porsch is a variant of the German language surname Borsch. Notable people with the name include:

 Andrea Porsch (1959), Austrian field hockey player
 Felix Porsch (1853–1930), German politician
 Manfred Porsch (1950), Austrian composer
 Otto Porsch (1875–1959), Austrian biologist
 Peter Porsch (1944), German academic and politician

References 

German-language surnames
Surnames from given names

de:Porsch